Grouse Creek in Humboldt County, California is a tributary on the west bank of the South Fork of the Trinity River. Its basin lies approximately 20–25 miles east of Eureka, California.

References 

Rivers of Humboldt County, California
Rivers of Northern California